Wisconsin's 5th congressional district is a congressional district of the United States House of Representatives in Wisconsin, covering most of Milwaukee's northern and western suburbs. It presently covers all of Washington and Jefferson counties, most of Waukesha County, and portions of Dodge, Milwaukee and Walworth counties. It is currently represented by Republican Scott Fitzgerald.

This was historically the most Republican district in Wisconsin, but as suburban areas have moved left, while rural and areas of industrial workers have moved right, the 7th and 8th have surpassed the 5th. However, this district remains solidly Republican for the time being. George W. Bush carried the district in 2004 with 63% of the vote. The 5th District was the only district in Wisconsin that John McCain won in 2008, giving 57.73% of the vote to McCain and 41.28% to Barack Obama.

Prior to the 2000 census (when Wisconsin lost a seat in Congress), the 5th District was a Milwaukee district, with vastly different boundaries and political history, represented often by Democrats or even Socialists. From 1983 to 2003, it covered the northern half of Milwaukee, including downtown, as well as some suburbs to the north. Meanwhile, most of the territory now in the 5th was part of the 9th District from 1965 to 2003. 

After Wisconsin lost a district in the 2000 census, all of Milwaukee was merged into the 4th district, while the old 9th essentially became the new 5th.

Counties and municipalities within the district

Dodge County
 Clyman, Horicon, Hustisford, Iron Ridge, Juneau, Lowell, Neosho, Reeseville, and Watertown (Dodge County side).

Jefferson
 Fort Atkinson, Jefferson, Johnson Creek, Lake Mills, Palmyra, Sullivan, Waterloo, Watertown, and Whitewater (Jefferson County side).

Milwaukee
 Greenfield and West Allis (half).

Walworth
 East Troy.

Washington
 Germantown, Hartford, Kewaskum, Newburg, Richfield, Slinger, and West Bend.

Waukesha
 Big Bend, Brookfield, Butler, Delafield, Chenequa, Douesman, Eagle, Elm Grove, Hartland, Lac La Belle, Lannon, Menomonee Falls, Merton, Mukwonago, Nashotah, New Berlin, North Prairie, Oconomowoc, Pewaukee, Summit, Sussex, Vernon, Wales, and Waukesha.

List of members representing the district

Recent election results

2002 district boundaries (2002–2011)

2011 district boundaries (2012–2021)

See also

Wisconsin's congressional districts
List of United States congressional districts

References

 Congressional Biographical Directory of the United States 1774–present

05